Exserohilum longirostratum is a species of fungus in the family Pleosporaceae. Found in India, it was described as new to science in 1957 as Helminthosporium longirostratum, and transferred to the genus Exserohilum in 1984.

References

External links

Fungi described in 1957
Pleosporaceae
Fungi of India